Pterolophia spinifera is a species of beetle in the family Cerambycidae. It was described by Quedenfeldt in 1888.

References

spinifera
Beetles described in 1888